George Dandy (December 3, 1890 – October 6, 1946) was a Negro leagues pitcher for several years before the founding of the first Negro National League.

He was a left-handed pitcher who pitched for the Chicago American Giants, West Baden Sprudels, and Lincoln Giants.

Dandy is buried in the Allegheny Cemetery in Pittsburgh.

References

External links

Chicago American Giants players
Lincoln Giants players
Louisville White Sox (1914-1915) players
1890 births
1946 deaths
Burials at Allegheny Cemetery
20th-century African-American sportspeople